Langarud (also Romanized as Langarūd, Langerūd, Langaroud and Langarood; also known as Shahr-e Langarūd), is a city and capital of Langarud County, Gilan Province, Iran.  The 2017 census showed the population as 79,445.

Langarud is located on the south coast of the Caspian Sea. One of the most important tourist attractions of Langarud is Chamkhaleh coast. Tourists enjoy horse jockeying and yachting in addition to the beach.

The old city is divided in two parts by Langeroud river. When Nader Shah was the king, Langerud had been one of the most important dockyards in the north of Iran. The most famous archaeological place in Langerud is the Clay Bridge (Pole Kheshti), a historical bridge across the Langerud river.

Climate
Langarud has a humid subtropical climate (Köppen: Cfa, Trewartha: Cf), with warm, humid summers and cool, damp winters.

See also

 Photo clip from Langarud

References

Populated places in Langarud County
Cities in Gilan Province
Populated places on the Caspian Sea